Celtic Fest Chicago is held the second weekend of May in Chicago's Millennium Park. It had previously been held in the second week in September, the first one having been held in the third week in September 1997 on Columbus Drive and Jackson Boulevard in Grant Park. Not just an "Irish" festival, Celtic Fest Chicago is a cultural celebration of the ancient Celtic nations of Ireland; Brittany, France; Galicia, Spain; Scotland; the Isle of Man; Cornwall and Wales. Celtic music enfolds a variety of rich cultures, as various geographical areas contribute diverse backgrounds and flavors. Celtic Fest Chicago celebrates this long history with music and traditions that date back to 300 B.C.

References

Music festivals in Chicago
Irish-American culture in Chicago
Scottish-American culture in Illinois
Welsh-American culture in Chicago
Festivals established in 1997
1997 establishments in Illinois